Fuca may refer to:

Juan de Fuca (1536 - 1602), a Greek maritime pilot in the service of the Spanish king Philip II
Fuca (clan), a Manchu clan

See also